The Lion of Amalfi (Italian: Il Leone di Amalfi) is a 1950 Italian historical adventure film directed by Pietro Francisci and starring Vittorio Gassman, Milly Vitale and Carlo Ninchi. After making his 1949 biopic Anthony of Padua, Francisci switched to making historical adventures. Gassman had attracted notice for his performance in the melodrama Bitter Rice leading to his casting in this film.

The film's sets were designed by the art director Flavio Mogherini. It was shot at the Palatino Studios in Rome. It grossed 256 million lire at the box office.

Synopsis
After the Duchy of Amalfi is invaded and conquered by the Normans, the last Duke's son Mauro leads a resistance movement to the tyrannical regime they impose.

Cast
Vittorio Gassman as Mauro
Milly Vitale as Eleonora
Sergio Fantoni as Ruggero
Carlo Ninchi as Roberto il Guiscardo
Elvi Lissiak as Diana
Achille Majeroni as Dino
Ughetto Bertucci as Luciano
Ugo Sasso as Attilio
Valerio Tordi as Pietro
Arnoldo Foà
Adele Bishop
Cesare Fantoni
Anna Di Lorenzo
Roberto Risso
Franco Silva

References

Bibliography
 Chiti, Roberto & Poppi, Roberto . Dizionario del cinema italiano: Dal 1945 al 1959. Gremese Editore, 1991.
 Moliterno, Gino. The A to Z of Italian Cinema. Scarecrow Press, 2009.
 Smith, Garry Allen. Epic Films: Casts, Credits and Commentary on More Than 350 Historical Spectacle Movies. McFarland, 2015.

External links
 

1950 films
1950 drama films
1950s historical drama films
1950 adventure films
Italian adventure films
Italian drama films
Italian historical drama films
1950s Italian-language films
Films directed by Pietro Francisci
Films scored by Carlo Rustichelli
Films set in Campania
Films set in the 11th century
Italian black-and-white films
Films shot at Palatino Studios
1950s Italian films